Alireza Mousavi (born 27 April 1990) is an Iranian handball player for Dinamo București and the Iranian national team.

Achievements 
Nemzeti Bajnokság I: 
Bronze Medalist: 2015 
Liga Națională:
Winner: 2016 
Sparkassen Cup:
Winner: 2013

References

External Links 
Alireza Mousavi on instagram

1990 births
Living people
Iranian male handball players
Sportspeople from Isfahan
Handball players at the 2014 Asian Games
Expatriate handball players
Iranian expatriate sportspeople in Hungary
Iranian expatriates in Romania
CS Dinamo București (men's handball) players
Asian Games competitors for Iran
Handball players at the 2018 Asian Games
21st-century Iranian people